Carlo Magno Jose Caparas (born December 15, 1948) is a Filipino comic strip creator and writer-turned film director and producer. He is best known for creating such Filipino superheroes and comic book characters as Panday, Bakekang, Totoy Bato, Joaquin Bordado, Kamagong, Kamandag, Elias Paniki, Tasya Fantasya, Gagambino, Pieta and Ang Babaeng Hinugot sa Aking Tadyang, among others. He is also known as a director of numerous massacre films such as Kuratong Baleleng and The Cory Quirino Kidnap: NBI Files.

Caparas was awarded the 2008 Sagisag Balagtas Award.

Career
In early January 1989, Caparas began producing a film about the Camp Cawa-Cawa siege at the same time as it was occurring, eventually finishing the film within two months and releasing it under the title Arrest: Pat. Rizal Alih – Zamboanga Massacre on March 8.

In February 2001, Caparas began plans to produce a film about EDSA II; it eventually became the 2003 biographical film Chavit, about politician Chavit Singson. In May 2003, he offered to produce a biographical film for then-chairman of Metro Manila Development Authority Bayani Fernando, though on July 31, Fernando revealed to reporters that he declined any offer for a film adaptation of his life due to election laws preventing any campaigns from being held before the campaign period begins in December 2003.

Proclamation as National Artist of the Philippines and controversy

National Artist of the Philippines
In July 2009, President Gloria Macapagal Arroyo named Caparas as one of seven National Artist of the Philippines proclaimed for that year, under the new category of "Visual Arts and Film."

The title National Artist of the Philippines is given to a Filipino who has been given the highest recognition for having made significant contributions to the development of Philippine arts. Such Filipinos are pronounced by virtue of a Presidential Proclamation to be National Artists, having been conferred membership in the Order of National Artists. Aside from the prestige associated with the proclamation, benefits they enjoy from then on include a monthly pension, medical and life insurance, arrangements for a state funeral, a place of honor at national state functions, and recognition at cultural events.

Controversy
This led to controversy, however, when the nominating committee for the award, composed of representatives from the National Commission for Culture and the Arts (NCCA) and the Cultural Center of the Philippines (CCP), revealed that Caparas and three other individuals that year had not originally been recommended by the committee for proclamation to the Order of National Artist, and had instead been proclaimed when Macapagal-Arroyo exercised her "presidential prerogative." A number of artists, including a number of previously proclaimed National Artists, protested. Protests specifically raised about the declaration of Caparas, and of NCCA executive director Cecilla Guidote-Alvarez, who heads the NCAA secretariat that receives nominations for national artists, was that he was supposed to be disqualified from being considered for the honor as per the National Artist guidelines.

Complaints regarding Caparas' proclamation centered on the complaints that he did not illustrate the comic books he wrote and was therefore not qualified for the honor under visual arts, and the assertion of protesting artists that his work in the category of Film is supposedly "sub-par", consisting largely of exploitation films such as "massacre films" whose focus was sensational crimes, and so-called "pito-pito" (literally, "seven-seven") films which are rush-produced in just seven days.

National Artist for literature Bienvenido Lumbera who is chairman of the Concerned Artists of the Philippines and a member of the combined "final selection committee" of the NCAA and CCP, remarked that Caparas’ nomination was twice rejected by two NCAA panels. "[Caparas] was first proposed as a nominee for literature, but the committee rejected him. He was again proposed as nominee for visual artist but the panel again turned him down." Film Academy of the Philippines director general Leo Martinez noted that "He was obviously added by Malacañang." Caparas is known as a vocal supporter of then President Gloria Macapagal Arroyo.

Petitions and blog posts online have also proliferated against Caparas in light of his controversial National Artist Recognition.

Lourd de Veyra, frontman for the band Radioactive Sago Project, also satirized the controversial director, and compared the director's work to fecal matter in a blog post about a sign that said "Bawal Tumae Dito." "The movies of National Artist Carlo J. Caparas are a fine example of Philippine excremental cinema," Lourd remarked

Defense

By the Arroyo Administration
The Arroyo administration was quick to defend its choices of individuals to be named to the Order of National Artists. Acting Executive Secretary and Presidential political adviser Gabriel Claudio told reporters that: "I think we can defend [their] track record and qualifications and reasons [for their selection]." He also said the administration would "stand by the qualifications, qualities, track record and reputation of those named as National Artists"."

By Caparas
Caparas defended his proclamation, saying that other aspirants to the honor ought to wait their turn.

Kaya lang, ganyan talaga kung may something for grabs. E, iisa lang ang pipiliin. Sana, maghintay na lang sila ng tamang panahon sa gusto nilang manalo. Hindi naman ito palakasan. (That's the way it is whenever something is up for grabs. Only one person can be selected. They ought to wait for the right time for whoever they want to win. This is not a case of sucking up.)

Kaya wag mag-alala ang mga critics ko, may pagkakataon pa sila at ang mga manok nila na manalo in the future. (So my critics shouldn't worry. There's still a chance that whoever they're rooting for can win in the future.) They cannot take the award from me anymore.

Baka ang nasa isip nila ay bata pa ako. Pero hindi naman ‘yon ang basehan. Sino naman ang ko-contest sa decision ng Cultural Center, ng NCCA at ng Malacañang tungkol sa award na ito? Mabuti na nga at ngayon pa lang ay ibinibigay na ang ganitong award sa mga taong nandito. Ang akala kasi nila ay sa matatanda o sa beterano o sa mga patay na ibinibigay ang ganitong award. Pati sa mga sipsip ibinibigay rin. (They probably think I'm too young. But that's not the basis. Who would contest the decision of the Cultural Center, the NCCA, and Malacañang regarding this award? It's a good thing they're giving this award to someone who's still here. They think awards like this should only be given to the old, to veterans, or to the dead.)

Caparas said that instead of criticizing his award, entertainment people "should unite and work together to revive the ailing movie and komiks industry." He attributed his win to the fact that he managed to cross over from comic books to film and television, and saying that his triumph was significant because he was a National Artist who came from the working class. He said this even though many other National Artists do not come from the privileged people. "I am a National Artist who came from the masses", the Philippine Daily Inquirer quoted him as saying. "I work and struggle with them." He said it was time for a National Artist "who the masses can identify with—someone who walks beside them, someone who can inspire them." Noting that some Filipinos did not even know the National Artists he said "Hopefully, since I am still active in TV and in the movies, this will encourage our countrymen to learn more about our National Artists."

Voiding by the Supreme Court
On July 16, 2013, the Supreme Court nullified the proclamation of Caparas and three others as National Artists.

Filmography
Film

TelevisionAng Panday (1987) - RPNPanday (2005) - ABS-CBNBakekang (2006) - GMACarlo J. Caparas' Kamandag (2007–08)Carlo J. Caparas' Joaquin Bordado (2008)Carlo J. Caparas' Tasya Fantasya (2008)Gagambino (2008) - GMAPieta (2008–09)Ang Babaeng Hinugot sa Aking Tadyang (2009) - GMATotoy Bato (2009) - GMAAgimat: Ang Mga Alamat ni Ramon Revilla Presents Carlo J. Caparas' Elias Paniki (2010)Dugong Buhay'' (2013) - ABS-CBN

Awards

References

External links

1958 births
Living people
Artists from Pampanga
Filipino film directors
Kapampangan people